Carlos Brogdon Embry Jr. (July 29, 1941 – September 29, 2022) was an American politician and a Republican member of the Kentucky Senate representing District 6 from January 1, 2015, until September 26, 2022, when he resigned due to cancer. He previously served in the Kentucky House of Representatives starting on January 1, 2003, and leaving office on January 1, 2015, to serve in the Kentucky Senate. Embry was a mayor of Beaver Dam, Kentucky from 1970 until 1973. Embry died three days after his resignation from the senate for health reasons at a hospice in Bowling Green, at the age of 81.

Education
Embry attended Duke University, Kentucky Wesleyan College, University of Kentucky, and University of Louisville, and earned his B.S. in English and geography from Western Kentucky University.

Elections
On September 26, 2022 Embry resigned, resulting in the Kentucky Senate District 6 seat becoming vacant. On November 8, 2022, Republican nominee Lindsey Tichenor defeated write-in Democratic candidate Brian Easley. Tichenor was sworn in on January 1, 2023 officially replacing Embry in the Kentucky Senate.
2018 Embry was unopposed for the May 22, 2018 Republican Primary and defeated Democratic nominee Crystal Chappell in the November 6, 2018 General Election winning with 27,139 votes (67.2%).
2014 Embry was unopposed for the May 20, 2014 Republican Primary and defeated Democratic nominee William Cox Jr. in the November 4, 2014 General Election winning with 21,591 votes (57.1%).
2012 Embry was unopposed for both the May 22, 2012 Republican Primary and the November 6, 2012 General election, winning with 13,077 votes.
2010 Embry was unopposed for the May 18, 2010 Republican Primary and the November 2, 2010 General election, winning with 11,118 votes (79.7%) against Democratic nominee Les Russell.
2008 Embry was unopposed for both the 2008 Republican Primary and the November 4, 2008 General election, winning with 13,249 votes.
2006 Embry was unopposed for both the 2006 Republican Primary and the November 7, 2006 General election, winning with 9,830 votes.
2004 Embry was challenged in the 2004 Republican Primary, winning with 2,176 votes (74.3%) and won the November 2, 2004 General election with 11,045 votes (69.3%) against Democratic nominee Larry Ashlock.
2002 When District 17 Representative Woody Allen left the Legislature and left the seat open, Embry won the three-way 2002 Republican Primary with 3,164 votes (43.1%) and won the November 5, 2002 General election with 7,518 votes (66.4%) against Democratic nominee James Hampton.

References

External links
Official page at the Kentucky General Assembly

C. B. Embry, Jr. at Ballotpedia
C B Embry Jr at the National Institute on Money in State Politics

1941 births
2022 deaths
Duke University alumni
Kentucky Wesleyan College alumni
Mayors of places in Kentucky
Republican Party Kentucky state senators
Republican Party members of the Kentucky House of Representatives
People from Morgantown, Kentucky
Politicians from Louisville, Kentucky
University of Kentucky alumni
University of Louisville alumni
Western Kentucky University alumni
People from Beaver Dam, Kentucky
21st-century American politicians